The Sri Lanka cricket team toured Scotland in May 2019 to play two One Day International (ODI) matches. The teams have played ODIs against each other twice before, with Sri Lanka winning both matches. The matches took place ahead of the 2019 Cricket World Cup, and were part of Sri Lanka's preparation for the tournament. Ahead of the World Cup, Dimuth Karunaratne was named as Sri Lanka's ODI captain, replacing Lasith Malinga. Sri Lanka won the series 1–0, after the first match was washed out.

Squads

ODI series

1st ODI

2nd ODI

References

External links
 Series home at ESPN Cricinfo

2019 in Scottish cricket
2019 in Sri Lankan cricket
International cricket competitions in 2019
Sri Lanka 2019